Denis Simon is an American professor and academic administrator.  Currently, he serves as Clinical Professor of Global Business and Technology at the Kenan Flagler Business School at the University of North Carolina at Chapel Hill.  He also serves as the Director of the Corporate Partner Program at the Frank Hawkins Kenan Institute of Private Enterprise at UNC.  

Simon was previously the Executive Vice Chancellor of Duke Kunshan University in China from 2015-2020, replacing Mary Brown Bullock.

A scholar of China, Simon has experience in the business and technology strategy fields. He previously served at the Duke Fuqua School of Business as a Professor of China Business and Technology, and Senior Adviser to the President for China Affairs.

At Duke Kunshan University, Simon oversaw the recruitment of the inaugural undergraduate class, campus construction, and faculty development.

In 2021, Simon was named executive director of the Center for Innovation Policy at Duke Law School.

Selected works 
  Innovation in China: Challenging the Global Science and Technology System (Polity, 2018) (Co-authored with R. Appelbaum, CAO Cong, HAN Xueying)

  China's Emerging Technological Edge: Assessing the Role of High-End Talent (Cambridge University Press,2009) (co-author CAO Cong)

 After Tiananmen: What Is the Future for Foreign Business in China? California Management Review, 1990

Awards and honors 

 The People's Republic of China Friendship Award

References

Living people
Duke University faculty
State University of New York at New Paltz alumni
Year of birth missing (living people)